The Ibis GS-700 Magic is a Colombian ultralight and light-sport aircraft, designed and produced by Ibis Aircraft of Cali, introduced in 2003. The aircraft is supplied as a kit for amateur construction or as a complete ready-to-fly-aircraft.

Design and development
The Magic was designed to comply with the Fédération Aéronautique Internationale microlight rules and US light-sport aircraft rules, with different models for each category. It features a strut-braced high-wing, a two-seats-in-side-by-side configuration enclosed cockpit, fixed tricycle landing gear and a single engine in tractor configuration. The Magic strongly resembles the Cessna 150.

The aircraft is made from sheet 6061-T6 aluminum. The standard engine available is the  Rotax 912ULS four-stroke powerplant. The Magic was designed to use rough, unimproved airstrips.

A total of 102 Magics of all versions had been built by May 2011.

Variants

GS-700
Base model for the Latin American market with a  gross weight and optional Junkers ailerons and leading edge slats. It was Australian RA-Aus certified on 16 April 2009 at  gross weight.
GS-700 LSA
Model for the US LSA category with a  gross weight.
GS-700 ULM (also called LV)
Model for the European microlight category with a  gross weight.

Specifications (GS-700 LSA)

References

External links

2000s Colombian civil utility aircraft
2000s Colombian ultralight aircraft
Homebuilt aircraft
Light-sport aircraft
GS-700
Single-engined tractor aircraft
High-wing aircraft